Burton is a hamlet and former civil parish, now in the parish of Bamburgh, in the county of Northumberland, England. It is situated to the south of the village of Bamburgh, a short distance inland from the North Sea coast. In 1951 the civil parish had a population of 60. On 1 April 1955 the civil parish was merged into Bamburgh.

Governance  
Burton is in the parliamentary constituency of Berwick-upon-Tweed.

References

External links 

Hamlets in Northumberland
Former civil parishes in Northumberland
Bamburgh